Richard Bulkeley Philipps Philipps, 1st Baron Milford (7 June 1801 – 3 January 1857), known as Richard Grant until 1823 and as Sir Richard Philipps, Bt, from 1828 to 1847, was a Welsh landowner and Whig politician.

Background
Born Richard Bulkeley Philipps Grant, he was the son of John Grant and Mary Philippa Artemisia, daughter of James Child and Mary Philippa Artemisia, daughter of Bulkeley Philipps, third son of Sir John Philipps, 4th Baronet, of Picton Castle. Bulkeley Phillips was the brother of Sir Erasmus Philipps, 5th Baronet and Sir John Philipps, 6th Baronet and the uncle of Sir Richard Philipps, 7th Baronet, who was created Baron Milford in 1776.

Political career
On the death of his cousin Lord Milford in 1823 and with his son, John Philipps, considered dead since 1805, Grant succeeded to the substantial Philipps estates in Wales, including Picton Castle (the baronetcy was passed on to a more distant male heir of Lord Milford; see Viscount St Davids), and assumed the surname of Philipps in lieu of his patronymic. The following year he was appointed Lord-Lieutenant of Haverfordwest in succession to Lord Milford, which he remained until his death. In 1826 he was returned to the House of Commons as the Member of Parliament (MP) for Haverfordwest, a seat he held until 1835, and again between 1837 and 1847. He was created a Baronet, of Picton Castle in the County of Pembroke, in 1828, and raised to the peerage as Baron Milford, of Picton Castle in the County of Pembroke, in 1847, a revival of the barony which had become extinct on his cousin's death in 1823.

Family
Lord Milford was twice married. He married firstly Eliza, daughter of John Gordon, of Hanwell, in 1824. After her death in 1852 he married secondly Lady Anne Jane, daughter of William Howard, 4th Earl of Wicklow, in 1854. There were no children from the two marriages and both titles became extinct on Lord Milford's death in January 1857, aged 55. His estates passed to his half-brother Reverend James Henry Alexander Gwyther, who assumed the surname of Philipps. James's daughter Mary Philippa married Charles Edward Gregg, who assumed the surname of Philipps and was created a Baronet, of Picton, in 1887 (see Philipps Baronets). Lady Milford died in 1909.

References

1801 births
1857 deaths
Barons in the Peerage of the United Kingdom
Lord-Lieutenants of Haverfordwest
Philipps, Richard, 1st Baronet
Philipps, Richard, 1st Baronet
Philipps, Richard, 1st Baronet
Philipps, Richard, 1st Baronet
Philipps, Richard, 1st Baronet
Philipps, Richard, 1st Baronet
Philipps, Richard, 1st Baronet
UK MPs who were granted peerages
Peers of the United Kingdom created by Queen Victoria